Tumble Bee is the eighth studio album by Laura Veirs, released in 2011. The album contains folk songs for children.

Track listing

Charts

References

2011 albums
Laura Veirs albums
Bella Union albums
Nonesuch Records albums
Albums produced by Tucker Martine
Covers albums
Children's music albums by American artists